Simona Halep defeated Serena Williams in the final, 6–2, 6–2 to win the ladies' singles tennis title at the 2019 Wimbledon Championships. The match lasted only 56 minutes, and Halep committed a major-final record of just three unforced errors. She lost only one set during the tournament, to Mihaela Buzărnescu. Halep became the first Romanian to win a Wimbledon senior singles title. Williams was attempting to equal Margaret Court's all-time record of 24 major singles titles. At 37 years and 291 days, Williams became the oldest major women's singles finalist in the Open Era.

Angelique Kerber was the defending champion, but lost in the second round to Lauren Davis. This was the first time in the Open Era that a defending major champion lost to a lucky loser.

This was the first major in which Ashleigh Barty competed as the world No. 1. She retained the top ranking following the tournament despite losing to Alison Riske in the fourth round. Naomi Osaka, Karolína Plíšková, Kiki Bertens and Petra Kvitová were also in contention for the top ranking.

15-year old Coco Gauff became the youngest player to win a main draw singles match at Wimbledon since Jennifer Capriati in 1991, defeating the oldest player in the main draw, Venus Williams at 39, in the first round. Gauff was also the youngest qualifier in Wimbledon history. She was defeated by Halep in the fourth round.

Karolína Muchová became the first player to reach the quarterfinals of Wimbledon in their debut since Li Na in 2006.

This was the first Wimbledon where a final-set tie break rule was introduced. Upon reaching 12–12 in the third set, a classic tie break would be played. No women's singles match required the use of the final-set tie break.

Seeds
Seeding per WTA rankings.

Qualifying

Draw

Finals

Top half

Section 1

Section 2

Section 3

Section 4

Bottom half

Section 5

Section 6

Section 7

Section 8

Championship match ratings
1.197 million on ESPN, in the USA

Championship match statistics

References

External links
 Ladies' singles draw at wimbledon.com
2019 Wimbledon Championships – women's draws and results at the International Tennis Federation

Women's Singles
Wimbledon Championship by year – Women's singles